AOA Black was a subgroup of the South Korean girl group AOA, formed by FNC Entertainment in 2013. Youkyung left the agency of the group in October 2016, but would remain as a guest member for future activities. Choa left the group and sub-unit on June 30, 2017, while Mina left the group in May 2019, Jimin in July 2020, and Yuna in January 2021. Due to the departures of all members, the subgroup was quietly disbanded immediately after Yuna left FNC. The subgroup was notable for their debut single album, "Moya".

History

2013-2021: Debut, departures from FNC, and disbandment
During the early year of 2013, FNC Entertainment officially announced the formation of the subgroup.  In early July of the same year, the label began providing teasers of the members on their upcoming debut.

Their debut single album, "Moya", was released on July 26, 2013. Download sales were up to 171,475 with physical CD sales at 2,692 according to Gaon Music Chart.

AOA Black made their first comeback appearance on the October 10 broadcast of KM's Music Triangle and performed the band version of "Get Out" for the first time. The band made their second appearance on the October 12 broadcast of Music Bank.

In an interview made by FNC in January 2016, it was announced that the group will most likely to have their comeback.

On October 15, 2016, it was announced that Youkyung had left the agency and group following the end of her contract, but would be a guest member in any future AOA Black activities. Soon afterwards Jimin posted a photo of all eight members on Instagram with the caption simply reading "AOA".

On June 22, 2017, Choa announced her departure from AOA. FNC Entertainment initially denied the statement, but on June 30, they confirmed Choa left the group.

On May 13, 2019, it was announced that Mina would be leaving AOA after deciding not to renew her contract with FNC Entertainment in order pursue an acting career.

On July 4, 2020, it was announced that Jimin would leave AOA following bullying allegations by former member Mina.

On January 1, 2021, it was announced that Yuna would leave FNC following the expiration of her contract. As a result of Yuna's departure from FNC, the subgroup was quietly disbanded immediately.

Discography

Notes

References

Musical groups established in 2013
Musical groups disestablished in 2016
South Korean musical groups
South Korean girl groups
FNC Entertainment artists
2013 establishments in South Korea